Pink Fantasy (often stylized as PinkFantasy) is a South Korean group consisting of 8 members: Daewang, SeeA, Yechan, Harin, Momoka, Arang, Miku and Heesun. The group has undergone several lineup changes; their original lineup consisted of Daewang, Aini, SeeA, Yechan, Harin, Arang, Heesun and pre-debut member Rai, who was later been replaced by Yubeen. The group debuted on October 24, 2018, with the single "Iriwa", which was released along with a music video, directed by Super Junior's Shindong. The group has several sub-units. The group is unique in that member Daewang's real identity is completely hidden, with her wearing a mask to hide her face.

History

Pre-debut 
Prior to debut, several of the group's members had experience in the music industry. Aini had previously debuted in the groups Kirotz and UNIZ, SeeA was previously a member of the group Piggy Dolls, Yechan was a member of Awe5ome Baby and Rai (predebut member) was in the Japanese-Taiwanese group Weather Girls under the stage name "Sindy".

Additionally, the group's first sub-unit "Sugar Powder" was formed predebut, consisting of Harin, Arang and Heesun. This unit was purely promotional and never released any songs.

2018: Debut 
The group made their official debut on October 24, 2018, with the single "Iriwa", accompanied by a music video. The music video features predebut member Rai, who left shortly before debut and was replaced by Yubeen. While Yubeen does not feature in the music video, the song was re-recorded to feature her instead of Rai.

2019: Further releases, sub-units and lineup changes 
On March 3, the group's first official sub-unit was announced called "Pink Fantasy SHY". This unit consisted of members SeeA, Yubeen and Harin. They debuted on March 26, 2019, with the single "12 o'clock".

On May 28, 2019, they made their Japanese debut with the Japanese version of their debut single "Iriwa".

In June 2019, Yubeen went on hiatus due to a panic disorder.

On July 15, 2019, the teaser schedule was released for their first comeback "Fantasy", to be released in August. On July 18 the addition of SangA was announced, making them a nine member group. Yubeen did not take part in this comeback due to her hiatus. Fantasy was released on August 5, 2019.

On October 18, 2019, MyDoll announced that Heesun had left Pink Fantasy and would halted all activities that same day, however, she remained under the company.

On November 1, 2019, they released a third single titled "Playing House". The music video was released on November 9, 2019

On December 17, 2019, the group's second official subunit "MDD" was formed, consisting of Yechan and Yubeen. They debuted with the single "Not Beautiful" on December 19, 2019.

2020: Further lineup changes, Pink Fantasy Shadow and guest members 
On April 12, 2020, it was announced Aini had left the group due to symptoms of Plantar Fasciitis and decreased physical strength. However, she would remain under MyDoll Entertainment as a model.

On June 19, 2020, a teaser for the single "Shadow Play" was posted on the group's official Twitter account, indicating a release date in July. It was announced that this single would technically be a song under the new sub-unit Pink Fantasy Shadow, but would be promoted as a regular Pink Fantasy song to avoid confusing broadcasting stations and to bring awareness to the group as a whole. Shadow Play was released on July 14, 2020, the sub-unit consisting of SeeA, SangA, Harin and Arang.

Before the release of Shadow Play, it was announced on June 28 that Yubeen had left the group due to her panic disorder, however, she would remain under MyDoll Entertainment.

On October 21, 2020, MyDoll announced that SangA had left the group after requesting her contract be terminated due to personal reasons.

On December 30, 2020, MyDoll announced that former member Heesun and MyDoll trainees Momoka, Miu and Miku would join the group as guest members for their 2021 comeback.

2021: "Lemon Candy", new members, Alice In Wonderland, Tales of the Unusual, and Merry Fantasy 
On January 21, 2021 they released the digital single "Lemon Candy", featuring former member Heesun as a guest member.

In May 2021, it was announced that, in addition to Heesun, two more new members would join as guest members of Pink Fantasy. On May 13, during the "Pink Pick PinkFantasy Fanmeeting" it was revealed that they would be Momoka and Miku.

On June 6, 2021, it was announced through the group's social networks, the release of their song "Poison" for June 21. The next day, two concept photos for this comeback were released along with the announcement of the group's first EP album, "Alice in Wonderland" set for the same day. On June 13, with a dance intro of "Alice in Darkland" a teaser for the group's first mini album was released, specifying that it will be the song No. 4 on the EP. On June 21, the EP "Alice In Wonderland" was released along with the music video for "Poison".

On October 28, 2021, it was announced through social media and news sites, the single "기기괴괴 (Tales Of The Unusual)" as the original soundtrack of Oh Seong-dae's NAVER webtoon under the same name, with release date set for October 31. In addition, it was reported that in the said song, members Daewang, SeeA and Yechan participated as lyricists. On October 31, a teaser video was released on social media, revealing that there would be two songs that would make up the EP "기기괴괴", being "기기괴괴 (Tales Of The Unusual)", sung by the whole group, and "Rain", a solo ballad song performed by member Yechan. On the same day at 18:00 KST, it was released on various streaming services along with the respective music video on YouTube for the eponymous song.

On December 7, the cover art of their new digital single "Merry Fantasy" was uploaded to the group's official social media account, announcing the release of the song for December 10. It's the first Christmas song of Pink Fantasy, and members Harin, Heesun and Momoka participated as lyricists. Korean music streaming services, such as Melon and Genie, describe the song as "a cute carol song, made based on the Christmas memories of Pink Fantasy members".

On December 24, the song "숨은 그대 찾기", a collaboration of member SeeA, along with two MustB members (Taegeon and Wooyeon), was released. This release is part of a project created by K-Stage, a concert-like event produced by music distributor and music artist management company, Naturally Music.

On December 26, through Daum fancafe and the group's social networks it was announced that the previously invited member Momoka will become an official permanent member from now on.

2022: LUV Is True, Tales of the Unusual (Feedback Version), Bizarre Story: Get Out 
On February 8, 2022, the release of "LUV Is True", a song dedicated to LUVIT, the group's fandom, was announced, expressing gratitude to the fans through the lyrics. A pre-release as NFT was scheduled for February 14, through NFTs music production company, 3PM, at while its official release was set for March 14. The said NFT company, showing concern for the environment, said that this NFT will be produced based on a Polygon blockchain that emits carbon at less than 1% of Ethereum's existing emission.

On April 1, the music video for the feedback version of "Tales of the Unusual", a song previously released in October 2021, was released through the group's YouTube channel, in response to the comments from netizens, differing from the original version mainly by the removal of the additional voice of Hyuk Jooni, who joined in by repeating the song title in the chorus, leaving now only the voices of PinkFantasy members. On April 8, this version was released through music streaming services.

On September 16, PinkFantasy staff announced that Daewang and SeeA won't participate in their new song due to SeeA's injury and Daewang focusing on producing the song.

On September 30, it was announced that PinkFantasy's comeback, Bizarre Story, will be out on October 24. Bizarre Story: Get Out was released with two tracks and an instrumental.

Members

Current 
Daewang (대왕)
SeeA (시아)
Yechan (예찬)
Harin (하린)
Momoka (모모카)
Arang (아랑)
Miku (미쿠)
Heesun (희선)

Former 
Rai (라이)
Aini (아이니)
SangA (상아)
Yubeen (유빈)
Miu (미우)

Sub-units
Sugar Powder: Harin, Arang, Heesun
Shy: SeeA, Harin, Yubeen (former)
MDD: Yechan,  Yubeen (former)
Shadow: SeeA, SangA (former), Harin, Arang

Timeline

Videography

Achievements 
In the 30th week of 2020, the song "Shadow Play" reached the 23rd position on the Gaon Album Chart.  In the first week of its release, it entered the 64th position.

During the week of June 21, 2021, their album "Alice In Wonderland" debuted at number 39 on the Gaon Album Chart.

Tours

PinkFantasy Latin Tour 

 February 14 - Mexico
 February 16 - Colombia
 February 19 - Paraguay
 February 21 - Uruguay
 February 23 - Argentina

The tour is currently suspended due to the COVID-19 pandemic.

References 

K-pop music groups
Musical groups established in 2018
South Korean girl groups
2018 establishments in South Korea
Musical groups from Seoul
South Korean dance music groups